Conductance may refer to:
 Conductance (graph), a measure in graph theory
 Electrical conductance, the ability for electric charge to flow in a certain path
 Fluid conductance, the ability for fluid to transmit through materials

See also 
 Conductivity (disambiguation)
 Thermal conductance (disambiguation)